The Missouri Heights School, in Garfield County, Colorado near Carbondale, Colorado, was listed on the National Register of Historic Places in 1999.

The  school was built in 1917. It is located at an elevation of  "in a rolling open alpine plateau area known since the late 1800s as Missouri Heights. Surrounded by cattle range and scrubland thick with sagebrush, the Missouri Heights School property includes a school building, a teacherage, two outhouses and a coal shed."

References

Schools in Colorado
National Register of Historic Places in Garfield County, Colorado
School buildings on the National Register of Historic Places in Colorado
School buildings completed in 1917